Scott & White Sleep Disorders Center is a modern center of research into sleep disorders in Temple, Texas. Its laboratory activity focuses on polysomnography. It holds accreditation from the American Academy of Sleep Medicine.

Sources
Scott & White Sleep Disorders Center website
Scott & White Memorial Hospital
 Perfect Sleep Infographic

Sleep disorders
Medical and health organizations based in Texas